"Was It Worth It?" is the first single from Children of Bodom's seventh studio album, Relentless Reckless Forever.

Background 
A music video has been shot for the single with skateboarder Chris Cole as well as noted pro skaters, Jamie Thomas, Garrett Hill, and Tom Asta.

"The single 'Was It Worth It?' is a total party song, said Laiho. "It's not your typical Bodom sound, but it's one of my favorites and heavy as hell."

The video was shot in Pennsylvania's residential Action Sports compound Camp Woodward and it was directed by Dale Resteghini for Raging Nation Films.

The song was made available for streaming on 13 January 2011 via Facebook. It was also released as downloadable content on Guitar Hero: Warriors of Rock on 8 February 2011.

Track listing

References 

2011 singles
Children of Bodom songs
Spinefarm Records singles
2011 songs
Songs written by Alexi Laiho
Music videos directed by Dale Resteghini